"Her First Ball" is a 1921 short story by Katherine Mansfield. It was first published in The Sphere on 28 November 1921, and later reprinted in The Garden Party and Other Stories.

Plot summary
A young girl called Leila has come to the city to stay with her cousins. They are going to a ball. Leila is very excited: this is her first ball. Once there, she is both excited and terrified. After dancing with several young boys her own age, she dances with a wrinkly balding man who has been coming to balls for a while. This spoils her mood until she dances with a good looking young gentleman where her worries disappear.

Characters
Leila, a cousin of the Sheridan Girls in The Garden Party. She is 18 years old.
Lucas
Tomas
Meg
Miss Eccles, Leila's dance teacher at boarding school.
Jose
The "Fat Man"
the first partner
the second partner
the third partner
the fourth partner
the cab driver (just her imagination before the ball)
teacher of History

Literary significance
The text is written in the modernist mode, without a set structure, and with many shifts in the narrative.
The main themes of the story are very dramatically portrayed through Leila's reactions and her emotions.

Footnotes

muiz khan

External links
The Garden Party and Other Stories at the British Library

Modernist short stories
1921 short stories
Short stories by Katherine Mansfield
Works originally published in The Sphere (newspaper)